William Mathews (1882 – 29 April 1921), sometimes known as Billy Mathews or William Mathews, was a Welsh professional footballer who played in non-league football for Chester and Rhyl as a half back. He was capped by Wales twice, in 1905 versus Ireland and in 1908 versus England.

Personal life 
Mathews was son of William and Elizabeth Mathews of Rhyl, Flintshire. He was married to Annie and had two children. Prior to becoming a professional footballer, he worked as a labourer and as an electric engine driver. In 1915, during the second year of the First World War, he enlisted in the Royal Welsh Fusiliers, but ultimately served as a Shoeing Smith with the Royal Field Artillery. In 1921, Mathews died of heart disease related to his war service and was buried in Christleton near Chester.

Honours 
Chester
 The Combination: 1908–09

See also
 List of Wales international footballers (alphabetical)
 Wales Football Data Archive

References

1883 births
Welsh footballers
Wales international footballers
Chester City F.C. players
Brentford F.C. wartime guest players
1921 deaths
Rhyl F.C. players
Sportspeople from Rhyl
British Army personnel of World War I
Royal Welch Fusiliers soldiers
Royal Field Artillery soldiers
Association football wing halves
British military personnel killed in World War I